State Route 326 (SR 326) is a  southwest-to-northeast state highway located mostly in rural areas of the northeastern part of the U.S. state of Georgia. Its route travels within portions of Jackson, Banks, and Franklin counties.

Route description

SR 326 begins at an intersection with US 441 Bus./SR 98 (Broad Street) in downtown Commerce, in Jackson County. At this point, it is known as Central Avenue, which continues past the western terminus of the state highway. SR 326 travels northeast for one block and intersects State Street. It turns right onto State Street and passes the Commerce Civic Center, before curving back to the northeast. The highway intersects US 441/SR 15 (Veterans Memorial Parkway) shortly before leaving the city limits of Commerce. At this intersection, the highway becomes known as Old Carnesville Road. During a brief eastward bend, it enters Banks County. Then, it curves again to the northeast. At an intersection with the southeastern terminus of Brown Bridge Road and the southwestern terminus of Duncan Road, SR 326 turns to the right, continuing to follow Old Carnesville Road. It curves to the east-northeast and then to the north-northeast and intersects the southeastern terminus of the aforementioned Duncan Road just before beginning to travel along the Banks–Franklin county line. At the county line, the "Old Carnesville Road" name ends. It curves to the north-northwest and crosses over the Hudson River, where the highway enters Franklin County proper. The highway makes a very gradual curve to the northeast and curve to the north, where it intersects the eastern terminus of Bold Springs Road (which used to be part of SR 164) and the southern terminus of Bold Springs Church Road. There, it diverges from that road and curve to the northeast and crosses over Carlan and Nails Creeks. After bending to the east-northeast, it intersects SR 51 (Sandy Cross Road). Just over  later, it meets its eastern terminus, an intersection with SR 106 (Athens Road) south-southwest of Carnesville.

SR 326 is not part of the National Highway System, a system of roadways important to the nation's economy, defense, and mobility.

History
In the 1818 map of Georgia by Eleazer Early  (cf. http://vault.georgiaarchives.org/digital/collection/hmf/id/19) there are two roads shown as running from Carnesville to Jefferson, crossing another road running from Danielsville northwestward into the land past the upper border of Franklin County. The upper of these two roads is shown crossing Grove Fork and Hudsons Fork above where the two rivers converge.  The lower of the two roads crosses below the convergence of Grove Fork and Hudsons Fork.  Comparing that map with the USGS map of Carnesville dated 1891, the route running from Harmony Grove (present day Commerce, GA) runs to Erastus, which is where the intersection exists today of Rt. 326, Brown's Bridge Rd. and Duncan Rd., known as Five Points to some.  From Erastus, the route turns northward crossing the Hudson River after its convergence with Grover Fork.

These early roads were perhaps Indian trading paths that were improved by early settlers as the Creek lands were surveyed and granted after 1783.  Benjamin Fry was granted one such parcel of 500 acres on the waters of Fry's Creek, present day Naked Creek, which runs to Hudson River near present day Rt. 326.

Major intersections

See also

References

External links

326
Transportation in Jackson County, Georgia
Transportation in Banks County, Georgia
Transportation in Franklin County, Georgia